Nudaria margaritacea is a moth of the subfamily Arctiinae first described by Francis Walker in 1865. It is found in Tibet and Sikkim, India.

References

Nudariina